The Initiative of Communist and Workers' Parties (INITIATIVE) is a European Marxist–Leninist political group. INITIATIVE has 30 member parties from all over Europe. The Communist Party of Greece was the main founder of INITIATIVE. The goal of INITIATIVE is to "contribute to the research and study of issues concerning Europe, particularly concerning the EU, the political line which is drawn up in its framework and affects the lives of the workers, as well as to assist the elaboration of joint positions of the parties and the coordination of their solidarity and their other activities".

Member parties

Former member parties

See also 
 List of communist parties represented in European Parliament
 Party of the European Left

References

External links 
 

Communism in Europe
Left-wing internationals
Anti-revisionist organizations
Pan-European political parties
Political parties established in 2013
Eurosceptic parties